Michael Giacchino is an American composer of music for films, television and video games. The following are a list of his wins and nominations for awards in music.

He's received an Academy Award, a BAFTA Award, a Critics' Choice Movie Award, a Primetime Emmy Award, and three Grammy Awards.

Major awards

Academy Awards

British Academy Film Awards

Critics' Choice Movie Awards

Golden Globe Awards

Grammy Awards

Primetime Emmy Awards

Miscellaneous awards

Annie Awards

Atlanta Film Critics Circle Awards

Austin Film Critics Association Awards

BMI Film & TV Awards

Central Ohio Film Critics Association Awards

Chicago Film Critics Association Awards

Chicago Indie Critics Awards

Critics Association of Central Florida Awards

Denver Film Critics Society Awards

DiscussingFilm Critics Awards

Georgia Film Critics Association Awards

Greater Western New York Film Critics Association Awards

Hawaii Film Critics Society Awards

Hollywood Critics Association Creative Arts Awards

Hollywood Music in Media Awards

Houston Film Critics Society Awards

Indiana Film Journalists Association Awards

IndieWire Critics Poll

International Cinephile Society Awards

International Film Music Critics Association Awards

Las Vegas Film Critics Society Awards

Latino Entertainment Journalists Association Film Awards

Los Angeles Film Critics Association Awards

Los Angeles Online Film Critics Society Awards

Minnesota Film Critics Alliance Awards

Music City Film Critics Association Awards

North Carolina Film Critics Association Awards

Oklahoma Film Critics Circle Awards

Online Film & Television Association Awards

Online Film Critics Society Awards

Phoenix Critics Circle Awards

Phoenix Film Critics Society Awards

San Diego Film Critics Society Awards

San Francisco Bay Area Film Critics Circle Awards

Satellite Awards

Saturn Awards

Seattle Film Critics Society Awards

Society of Composers & Lyricists

Southeastern Film Critics Association Awards

St. Louis Gateway Film Critics Association Awards

Sunset Film Circle Awards

Utah Film Critics Association Awards

Washington D.C. Area Film Critics Association Awards

World Soundtrack Awards

Other awards
2001 Interactive Achievement Awards for Original Music Composition – Medal of Honor: Underground
2003 Game Developers Choice Awards for Excellence in Audio – Medal of Honor: Allied Assault
2003 Interactive Achievement Awards for Original Music Composition – Medal of Honor: Frontline
2004 Game Developers Choice Awards for Excellence in Audio – Call of Duty
2007 Film & TV Music Award for Best Score for a Short Film – Lifted
2007 StreamingSoundtracks.com Award for Composer of the Year

Recognition
 The score for season 1 of Lost was cited by New Yorker music critic Alex Ross as "some of the most compelling film music of the past year".

Conductor
 Conductor of the 81st Academy Awards in 2009.

Notes

References

Giacchino, Michael